AngelHack is an American company based in San Francisco that primarily organizes and hosts hackathons for other companies.

History 
Founded in 2011, AngelHack distinguished itself from other hackathon organizers by coordinating global hackathons which took place simultaneously in different places.

The company now brands itself as a developer ecosystem. As of 2022, it is headed by Justin Ng and lists Mark Cuban as one of its "advisors."

Users 

AngelHack claims over 200,000 members and hosts various educational events for developers.

Controversies 
One of AngelHack's co-founders, Greg Gopman, was sued in 2014 by a fellow AngelHack co-founder for allegedly using the company's finances for "elaborate vacations" in Thailand and Colombia. After leaving AngelHack, Gopman has since garnered controversy for referring to homeless people in San Francisco as "hyenas."

References 

Technology companies established in 2011
2011 establishments in California
Technology companies based in the San Francisco Bay Area
Hackathons
Hacker culture
Software development events